Thomas Rush (1490–1560) was an English serjeant-at-arms who served Henry VII and Henry VIII.

Thomas Rush may also refer to:
Thomas Rush (cricketer) (1874–1926), Australian cricketer
Tom Rush (born 1941), American singer, songwriter and musician
Tom Rush (1970 album)